Schoonderlogt estate is a 17th century country house in Elst, Netherlands.

History
The original farm was demolished around 1900 by its owner Gaymans who built the present country house. In addition to the country house a farm and barn was also built.

Schoonderlogt played a role in WWII, when it became the headquarters of 2nd Battalion of the U.S. Army's 506th Parachute Infantry Regiment. Together with the 501th and 502th P.I.R Regiment, the 327 Glider Infantry Regiment and other additional military units, they formed the American 101st Airborne Division, who landed 17 September 1944 at Eindhoven.

During the Battle of 'The Island' Schoonderlogt farm was temporary HQ of the 506th PIR. There's a well known picture of Major Richard D. Winters in front of the entrance gate.

Schoonderlogt plays a role in the Band of Brothers series of Steven Spielberg and Tom Hanks.

In front of the estate a Memorial 101st Airborne Division 506 P.I.R was placed in 2020.

Gallery

References

Band of Brothers characters
 
Western European Campaign (1944–1945)
Land battles of World War II involving the United Kingdom
Battles and operations of World War II involving the Netherlands
1944 in the Netherlands
October 1944 events
Battles in Gelderland
Buildings and structures in Gelderland
Overbetuwe